Ștefan Cantacuzino (Stephanos Kantakouzinos), (c. 1675 – 7 June 1716) was a  Prince of Wallachia between April 1714 and January 21, 1716, the son of stolnic Constantin Cantacuzino. He was married to Păuna Greceanu-Cantacuzino.

Life
Ștefan was involved in his father's intrigue against Prince Constantin Brâncoveanu, denouncing him to the Ottoman Empire (Wallachia's overlord), and surrendering Brâncoveanu's secret correspondence with the Habsburg monarchy, enemies of the Porte in the Great Turkish War. After obtaining the Prince's deposition, he took the throne in Bucharest as an Ottoman appointee.

His rule coincided with the Habsburg attack led by Prince Eugene of Savoy, during which the Cantacuzinos shook off Ottoman tutelage, informing Stephan Graf Stainville on the Porte's war preparations. A kapucu was sent to depose Prince Ștefan in January 1716, and arrested him together with his father and uncle (the spătar Mihai Cantacuzino). The three of them were executed in Constantinople.

Following Ștefan Cantacuzino's death, the Phanariote rule in Wallachia was established as a way to ensure a tighter Ottoman control over Wallachia.

See also
Cantacuzino family

References
Neagu Djuvara, Între Orient și Occident. Țările române la începutul epocii moderne, Humanitas, Bucharest, 1995, p. 31, 336

1715 deaths
Stefan
Executed monarchs
Rulers of Wallachia
Romanian people executed abroad
18th-century executions by the Ottoman Empire
Year of birth unknown
Craiovești